Marlon Nathaniel Samuels (born 5 February 1981) is a former Jamaican cricketer who played internationally for the West Indies in all three formats, and a former ODI captain. He is a right-handed middle order batsman and an off-spinner. He was a key member of the West Indies team that won the 2012 ICC World Twenty20 and 2016 ICC World Twenty20, and was named man of the match in the final of both tournaments, becoming the first man to achieve the feat.

Samuels made his Test debut in Australia in 2000, and his One Day International debut against Sri Lanka in Nairobi during the ICC Knockout Trophy in the same year.

In 2013 he was named one of the Wisden Cricketers of the Year. He was one of the franchise players for the inaugural Caribbean Premier League. In 2016 the West Indies Cricket Board named Samuels as the ODI Player of the Year and the Cricketer of the Year.

On 4 November 2020, Samuels announced his retirement from professional cricket. He had already informed CWI about his retirement in June 2020.

Personal life
During January 1981, Samuels was born in Kingston to parents Philip and Daphne. He has seven siblings as in four brothers and three sisters. As well the younger brother of Robert Samuels, a former cricketer who played for the Windies. As well he attended Kingston College and soon became a member of the Melbourne Cricket Club.

Domestic career
During the West Indies tour of Australia, on 9 October 2005, Samuels registered his highest first-class score with an innings of 257. It was made in a tour match against Queensland at the Gabba. His effort was a record score at the ground, beating Martin Love's 250. Showing his allround abilities, he followed it up with 5 wickets in the next innings.

The Bangladesh Cricket Board founded the six-team Bangladesh Premier League in 2012, a twenty20 tournament to be held in February that year. An auction was held for teams to buy players, and Samuels was bought by the Duronto Rajshahi for $360,000. He was the team's highest run-scorer with 242 from 11 innings in the competition. In February 2012, Samuels signed a contract with Pune Warriors India to play for them in the 2012 and 2013 Indian Premier League (IPL). The 2012 IPL clashed with Australia's tour of the West Indies, and Samuels was granted permission to skip the three Test series and play in the league. During the tournament, he was reported for having a suspect bowling action, and was suspended from bowling for the rest of the competition.

In October 2012, Samuels was selected for the Melbourne Renegades in the 2012/2013 Big Bash T20 League.

Samuels helped Peshawar Zalmi to win the 2017 Pakistan Super League, and Kowloon Cantons to win the 2017 Hong Kong T20 Blitz. Despite his then recent success, he was not selected until the 8th round of the 2017 Caribbean Premier League draft, when he was picked up by the St Lucia Stars.

International career

Debut years
Samuels first played for the Windies at two successive U19 Cricket World Cups. During the West Indies' 2000 tour of Australia, Samuels scored 60 not out and 46 at the Melbourne Cricket Ground, in his second test match. He went on to score his maiden Test hundred at Kolkata against the Indians in 2002/03. His innings of 104 helped the West Indies to draw the 3rd Test and was made against the likes of Javagal Srinath, Anil Kumble and Harbhajan Singh. His first ODI ton came in the series which followed and turned out to be a series winning innings. With the series level at 3–3 going into the final match at Vijayawada on 24 November 2002, Samuels smacked 108 not out off just 75 balls. The West Indies finished with 315 and went on to win by 135 runs.

He played in two Tests on the tour of Australia in 2005, with a highest score of 29, before he was sent home with a knee injury.

Permanent member
Against Pakistan at Multan in late 2006, Samuels scored his second ODI century. His unbeaten 100 led the West Indies to victory as they successfully chased the Pakistani total. He fell just short of another century a month later against the Indians in Chennai but his quick fire 98 helped his side chase down India's 268. Samuels was involved in the run-out of Brian Lara in his last international match, against England during the 2007 World Cup. Lara was on 18, when Samuels signalled for a quick run but was unable to reach the other wicket in time as Kevin Pietersen underarmed the ball to hit the stumps. After the World Cup, the West Indies toured England in May. Unexpectedly Samuels was not initially included in the squad for the Test leg, but was called up as a replacement when Ramnaresh Sarwan suffered an injury. On 4 July Samuels made 77 runs from 104 balls against England in the second Natwest ODI. He and Shivnarine Chanderpaul scored a record third wicket partnership of 175 runs at Edgbaston in a game West Indies won.

In December 2007, Samuels was named man of the match after scoring 94 and 40 in the first Test against South Africa in Port Elizabeth, a match the West Indies won by 128 runs. He went on to score his second Test hundred, in the final match, hitting 105 although it wasn't enough for his side to win the match or the series.

Ban in 2008
On 25 February 2008 Samuels was suspended from bowling in international cricket until he corrects his bowling action, which has been deemed suspect. Indian police accused Samuels of giving out team information to a known bookie prior to the 1st ODI between the West Indies and India in Nagpur on 21 January 2007. It was claimed that they have taped telephone conversations between a bookmaker, Mukesh Kochchar, and Samuels. The transcript was later released by the police. After a hearing into the matter, in May the International Cricket Council enforced a two-year ban on the 27-year-old for "receiving money, or benefit or other reward that could bring him or the game of cricket into disrepute". Samuels maintained his innocence.

Return in 2010
Samuels' two-year ban expired on 9 May 2010, and he subsequently returned to playing for Jamaica. West-Indian chief selector Clyde Butts stated that the door was open for Samuels to serve the Windies in international cricket provided that he proved himself on the domestic circuit. During the 2011 World Cup in February and March, all-rounder Dwayne Bravo suffered an injury and the West Indies Cricket Board asked Samuels to fly out to act as a replacement. Samuels declined, stating that he did not yet feel ready, but that he was targeting a return during India's tour of the West Indies in June and July.

The West Indians were knocked out from the quarter finals of the World Cup, and in the team's first engagement after was hosting Pakistan in April and May. When the T20I squad was announced, four uncapped players were included and Samuels was recalled, marking a return to the squad for the first time since the expiration of his ban. Samuels returned to the Test side for the second Test and scored a half-century in his first innings.

Golden years
Samuels was selected in the West Indies Test squad to tour England after the IPL. In the first Test Samuels combined with Chanderpaul in a 157-run stand. However, with England batting on the final day to win the match Samuels was asked to bowl. His part-time off spin was called upon as the West Indies had entered the match without a specialist spinner, while Shannon Gabriel was injured and Fidel Edwards ineffective. Samuels scored his third Test century in his next innings, and combined with captain Darren Sammy to score 204 runs, the second-highest partnership for the West Indies' seventh wicket.

Samuels was named man of the match in the final of the 2012 ICC World Twenty20, in which the West Indies beat Sri Lanka by 36 runs to claim the title. He scored 78 off 56 balls, an innings which included six sixes and three fours. He was named in the 'Team of the Tournament' for the 2012 T20 World Cup by the ICC. For his performances in 2012, he was named in the Test XI and T20I XI of the year by Cricinfo.

During the pool match against Zimbabwe in 2015 Cricket World Cup, Samuels scored his 8th ODI century. He along with Chris Gayle scored record breaking 372 run for the second wicket, which is the highest ever partnership for any wicket in ODIs. In the match, Gayle recorded first double century in World Cup history as well.

Samuels was also named man of the match in the final of the 2016 ICC World Twenty20 in which he scored an unbeaten 85 off 66 balls to help West Indies beat England by 4 wickets and capture their second World Twenty20 title. Samuels was later named as the 2016 West Indies' ODI Player of the Year and Cricketer of the Year.

Illegal bowling & drop from squad
During the first test at Galle in 2015, Samuels was again reported about suspect bowling action. The action was found to be illegal for the second time and Samuels was banned from bowling in international arena for 12 months. His bowling action was cleared on 16 February 2017 by the ICC with the permitted 15-degree limit.

On 4 November 2016, Samuels was dropped from the ODI squad for 2016–17 Zimbabwe Tri-Series due to poor performances in tests against Pakistan in October.

Return in 2017
On 24 February 2017, Samuels discussed with WICB about the omission him from West Indies squad and suggested he could accept a Kolpak deal in county cricket. However, on 21 August 2017, WICB took the decision to include Samuels along with Gayle to return ODIs for the series against England.

Controversy
Samuels was involved in a controversy during the Melbourne derby on 6 January 2012 against the Shane Warne-led Melbourne Stars; during the Stars' innings, Samuels held back David Hussey at the non-striker's end when the batters were trying to take a second run off Samuels' bowling. Warne reacted angrily to this when he was later bowling to Samuels himself swearing and cursing; he continuously sledged Samuels, asking if he was going "grab hold of my shirt too, Marlon?" The incident escalated when Warne threw a cricket ball on Samuels, who responded by throwing his bat away. This led to an angry confrontation between the two mid-pitch. Both players were suspended, but Samuels missed the rest of the BBL season in any case, as he received an injury due to a bouncer from Lasith Malinga in the same game. The pair have been far from kind about each other in interviews since this incident.

Samuels also has something of a feud with Ben Stokes; this began during the England cricket tour to the West Indies 2014-15. In the Second Test match, in which Samuels scored a century, he mocked Stokes' attempts to distract him with sledging as he batted, saying that it only concentrated his mind on the job in hand. When Stokes was then dismissed for 8 on Day 3 of the same match, Samuels saluted the departing batsman.

The feud resurfaced during the final of the 2016 ICC World Twenty20, during which Samuels scored a crucial 85. Stokes bowled the final over of the match to Carlos Brathwaite, with Samuels at the non-striker's end. After Brathwaite hit 4 sixes to win the game for the West Indies, Samuels claimed that Stokes "never learns".

Tensions again arose between Samuels and Stokes in 2020; Stokes, who had been forced to quarantine while visiting his family in New Zealand during the COVID-19 pandemic, later joked that the experience of isolation had been so tough "he wouldn't wish it on his worst enemy" - when asked if he included Samuels in that statement, he responded "no, it's that bad". Samuels responded on his social media with an expletive-laden post referencing Stokes' wife, which drew a negative response from many in the cricketing world. Among those to respond was Shane Warne, who told Samuels that he "needs serious help". Samuels again took to social media to respond, mocking Warne for having plastic surgery.

In September 2021, Samuels was charged with breaching the ICC anti-corruption code, for his time playing in the T10 League in 2019.

Accolades
Samuels features along with eighteen other cricketers upon a mural at Sabina Park which aims to illustrate the spirit of Jamaican cricket.

List of international centuries
Samuels has scored seven centuries in Test matches and ten in One Day Internationals. His highest Test score of 260 came against Bangladesh at Sheikh Abu Naser Stadium, Khulna in November 2012 and his highest ODI score of 133* came against Zimbabwe at Manuka Oval, Canberra in February 2015.

Test international centuries

One Day International centuries

Other Ventures
In 2020, Samuels launched his first fragrance, named Sextillion.  Since 2013, he has also supported blind charities in the Caribbean, especially in his native Jamaica, through the Marlon Samuels Foundation. He hopes that he will be able to adapt the focus of the foundation's work towards fighting breast cancer in the near future. As his career has wound down, Samuels has also begun to focus on the music industry; he has released songs to his YouTube channel under the stage-name Icon7.

Records
 First player to receive 2 Player of The Final awards in ICC World T20 history. He also became only the second player after Shahid Afridi in history to score a half century and to take at least a single wicket in a T20 World Cup final.
 With Kane Williamson he shares the record for the highest individual score in an ICC World T20 final (85). Samuels also holds the record for the highest score in a successful chase in an ICC World T20 final.
 Highest ever ODI partnership for any wicket, along with Gayle - 372 runs for 2nd wicket and also it is the highest ever runstand in for any wicket in World Cup history.

References

External links

MyCricketLife

West Indies Test cricketers
West Indies Twenty20 International cricketers
West Indies One Day International cricketers
Jamaican cricketers
Jamaica cricketers
Rajshahi Royals cricketers
Pune Warriors India cricketers
Melbourne Renegades cricketers
Antigua Hawksbills cricketers
St Kitts and Nevis Patriots cricketers
Comilla Victorians cricketers
Leeward Islands cricketers
Peshawar Zalmi cricketers
Delhi Capitals cricketers
Saint Lucia Kings cricketers
Wisden Cricketers of the Year
1981 births
Living people
Cricketers at the 2015 Cricket World Cup
Cricketers banned for corruption
Cricketers from Kingston, Jamaica